This event was held on 2 February 2013 as part of the 2013 UCI Cyclo-cross World Championships in Louisville, Kentucky, United States. Belgian Sven Nys took home the gold for the second time in his career, a few seconds ahead of Klaas Vantornout, another Belgian. In the background, Lars van der Haar of the Netherlands managed to secure a third spot in his first year with the elite men.

Race report

The race started with some outsiders hoping for a lucky break, after one lap Martin Bína from Czech Republic, Francis Mourey from France and Marco Aurelio Fontana from Italy were the first three to cross the line. A mere lap further Mourey had even created a lead on the favourites. Slowly but surely those favourites, all Belgians, caught up with Mourey. Halfway into the race there was a lead group consisting of Mourey and the Belgians Kevin Pauwels, Klaas Vantornout and Sven Nys. 2012 world champion Niels Albert trailed shortly behind that group, but never really managed to catch up.

Lap six saw the end of Pauwels' chances for the rainbow jersey. Twice his chain gave him troubles and he dropped back to the 15th spot. Mourey shared his luck and suffered a flat tire. Suddenly only Nys and Vantornout were left to compete for the gold. They kept an even match, though Nys showed he should be feared by 'flying' over the barriers every lap again, creating a small gap each time. In the last lap, as Nys grabbed the lead to go up the limestone steps. Vantornout, in his haste to keep up, turned too sharply into a corner and got stuck in the sidelines of the track. Vantornout only lost about a second, but Nys went for his chance and gave it his all. With that tiny lead he hopped quickly over the barriers again, sealing Vantornout's fate.

In the back it long looked like Albert would be completing the podium, but the young Dutchman Lars van der Haar rode an impressive race and got the fifth medal for Netherlands in the 2013 World Championships. Albert dropped away completely to an eight spot. Bart Wellens of Belgium unexpectedly managed to grab the fourth spot.

Results

References

Men's elite race
UCI Cyclo-cross World Championships – Men's elite race
UCI Cyclo, Men's Elite